Dorothy Margaret Doig Edgington FBA (née Milne, born 29 April 1941) is a philosopher active in metaphysics and philosophical logic.  She is particularly known for her work on the logic of conditionals and vagueness.

Life and education
Dorothy Edgington was born on 29 April 1941 to Edward Milne and his wife Rhoda née Blair. She attended St Leonards School before going to St Hilda's College, Oxford to read PPE. She obtained her BA in 1964, followed in 1967 by a BPhil at Nuffield College, Oxford.

Career
Most of Edgington's career was spent at Birkbeck College. Her first academic post in 1968, was as Lecturer in Philosophy at Birkbeck and she remained there until 1996. From 1996 until 2001 she was appointed Fellow of University College, Oxford. This was followed by a professorship at Birkbeck from 2001–03. She was then Waynflete Professor of Metaphysical Philosophy at the University of Oxford from 2003 until  2006. She is now Emeritus Professor, and Fellow of Magdalen College, Oxford and teaches at Birkbeck again part-time. 

Birkbeck College hosts a lecture series named after Edgington; in 2012, the lectures were given by John McDowell, in 2014 they were given by Rae Langton, and in 2016 the Edgington Lectures were given by Kit Fine.

From 2004 to 2005 she was President of the Mind Association 2004–5 and she was President of the Aristotelian Society for 2007–8. She is a Fellow of the British Academy.

Selected publications 
 'The Paradox of Knowability' (1985), Mind 94:557–568.  Presents a resolution of Fitch's paradox based on situation semantics.
 'On Conditionals' (1995), Mind 104:235–329. Defends an epistemic theory of conditionals against a truth-functional one, as part of the Mind's state of the art series.
 'Vagueness by Degrees'. In Rosanna Keefe & Peter Smith (eds.), Vagueness: A Reader. MIT Press (1997)
 'Counterfactuals and the Benefit of Hindsight'. In Phil Dowe & Paul Noordhof (eds.), Cause and Chance: Causation in an Indeterministic World. Routledge (2004) 
 Conditionals (2006), The Stanford Encyclopedia of Philosophy.

References

External links
Dorothy Edgington personal webpage, Birkbeck

1941 births
Living people
20th-century British philosophers
21st-century British philosophers
Analytic philosophers
British women philosophers
Academics of Birkbeck, University of London
Waynflete Professors of Metaphysical Philosophy
Fellows of Magdalen College, Oxford
Fellows of the British Academy
Presidents of the Aristotelian Society